Sergey Dmitriyevich Shavlo (born 4 September 1956) is a former Soviet and Ukrainian/Russian footballer.

Playing biography
Shavlo made his name as a footballer in Latvia – at first he played for Elektrons Rīga but soon he caught the eye of FK Daugava Rīga management and transferred to the top Latvian team. For Daugava he played two years and then he moved to Spartak Moscow which was then playing together with Daugava in the first Soviet league and was undergoing a hard time with generation of players change. The mobile midfielder with a good pass came in handy for the Konstantin Beskov side and in 1977 with Shavlo Spartak returned to the top division and in 1979 – won the Soviet championship. In 1986 Shavlo moved to Torpedo Moscow with which he won the Soviet Cup.

Shavlo also played in the Soviet national football team capping 19 appearances. With the Soviet Olympic football team he won a bronze medal at the 1980 Summer Olympics.

Despite his already veteran age in 1987 Shavlo moved to Rapid Vienna thus becoming one of the first Soviet footballers to play abroad. After a couple of seasons he went on to coach different Austrian and Russian teams.

In 2004 Shavlo returned to Spartak, first working as a scout but in September 2005 he was appointed director of the club. He worked in that capability till 7 August 2008 when his contract ran out and he decided not to renew it.

Achievements

Soviet Top League
Winner: 1 (1979)
Runner-up: 4 (1980, 1981, 1984,1985)
3rd position: 1 (1982)
Soviet First League
Winner: 1 (1977)
Soviet Cup
Winner: 1 (1986)
Runner-up: 1 (1981)
Austrian Bundesliga
Winner: 1 (1988)
Olympic Games
Bronze medal: 1 (1980)

References

External links

1956 births
Living people
People from Nikopol, Ukraine
Ukrainian emigrants to Russia
Soviet footballers
Soviet Union international footballers
Soviet Top League players
Soviet First League players
Soviet expatriate footballers
Russian footballers
Russian expatriate footballers
Expatriate footballers in Austria
Soviet expatriate sportspeople in Austria
Daugava Rīga players
FC Spartak Moscow players
FC Torpedo Moscow players
SK Rapid Wien players
Olympic footballers of the Soviet Union
Footballers at the 1980 Summer Olympics
Olympic bronze medalists for the Soviet Union
Olympic medalists in football
Medalists at the 1980 Summer Olympics
Association football midfielders
FC Iskra Smolensk players
Austrian Football Bundesliga players